The Chicago Whales were a professional baseball team based in Chicago. They played in the Federal League, a short-lived "third Major League", in 1914 and 1915. They originally lacked a formal nickname, and were known simply as the "Chicago Federals" (or "Chi-Feds") to distinguish them from the Chicago Cubs and Chicago White Sox.

They came to an end when the Federal League came to a deal with the National and American Leagues that disbanded all its teams. The Whales are notable as the original occupants of the stadium now known as Wrigley Field, the current home of the Chicago Cubs and the only Federal League stadium still in use.

History
The Chicago team played the 1913 initial season of the Federal League, as the new league was formed as an independent minor league. Without a formal nickname, the team was called the Chicago Keeleys in 1913, after manager Burt Keeley. The 1913 Chicago team ended the season in fourth place with a 57–62 record, finishing 17.5 games behind the first place Indianapolis Hoosiers (75–45). The Cleveland Green Sox (64–54), St. Louis Terriers (59–60) Covington Blue Sox/Kansas City Packers (32–45) and Pittsburgh Filipinos (49–71) were the other members of the 1913 six-team Federal League.

As the 1913 season was being played, the Federal League began talks of its future and decided to continue playing with the design of becoming a major league in 1914. Chicago businessman James A. Gilmore was appointed Federal League president, replacing John T. Powers. Gilmore initially secured Charles Weeghman, a wealthy Chicago restaurateur, to become the owner of the Chicago franchise in the Federal League. Gilmore further positioned the league by securing influential owners in Brooklyn, New York and St. Louis, Missouri.

The 1914 Chicago club finished 1½ games behind the Indianapolis Hoosiers in the inaugural major league season for the league. The team lacked a formal nickname and was known simply as the Chicago Federals. Before the start of the season, Weeghman built a stadium for the team, called Weeghman Park, designed by Zachary Taylor Davis, who had previously designed Comiskey Park. He also leased the parcel on which the park stood for 99 years.

In the league's second and final season, the Chicago Federals adopted the nickname "Whales". They included the logo of a whale inside a large "C" on their uniform shirts. The Whales won the league championship, finishing with 86 wins and 66 losses, percentage points ahead of the St. Louis Terriers' 87–67 record.

When Kenesaw Mountain Landis brokered a deal between the Federal League, American League and National League that ended the Federal League's existence, Weeghman was allowed to buy a controlling interest in the Cubs. He then merged the Whales with the Cubs and moved the Cubs from West Side Park into his new steel-and-concrete structure. While Weeghman himself was forced out within four years due to financial troubles, the Cubs still play in the park he built to this day, the only Federal League park still in use. It was renamed Cubs Park in 1920 and acquired its present name, Wrigley Field, in 1926.

Many Whales players had American and National League experience, including manager Joe Tinker, Dutch Zwilling, Mordecai Brown, and Rollie Zeider.

As the Federals, they played the first game at Wrigley Field on April 23, 1914, and to mark the park's centennial on April 23, 2014, the Cubs wore the Federals' uniforms.

Baseball Hall of Famers

References

See also
Chicago Whales all-time roster
1914 Chicago Federals season
1915 Chicago Whales season

 
Baseball teams established in 1914
Baseball teams disestablished in 1915
Federal League teams
Defunct Major League Baseball teams
Whales
1914 establishments in Illinois
1915 disestablishments in Illinois
Defunct baseball teams in Illinois
Whales and humans